André Chenail (born July 12, 1946) is a farmer and former political figure in Quebec. He represented Beauharnois-Huntingdon from 1989 to 2003 and Huntingdon in the National Assembly of Quebec from 2003 to 2007 as a Liberal.

He was born in Sainte-Clotilde, Quebec, the son of Fridolin Chenail and Évelina Catman, and was educated there, at Sainte-Marguerite-du-Lac-Masson, at the Collège de Laprairie and at Saint-Rémi. He was president and founder of Fermes du Soleil which specialized in the production and distribution of vegetables, and then Terres du Soleil, a company involved in real estate promotion. Chenail was a member of the municipal council for Sainte-Clotilde from 1973 to 1975 and 1976 to 1980 and mayor from 1982 to 1989. He was prefect for the regional municipality of Jardins-de-Napierville in 1987 and 1988. Chenail was elected in the 2003 election but was defeated by Albert De Martin of the ADQ when he ran for reelection in 2007.

See also
Politics of Quebec

References

External links
 

1946 births
Living people
Quebec Liberal Party MNAs
People from Montérégie
21st-century Canadian politicians